Henry de Bohun, 1st Earl of Hereford (1176 – 1 June 1220) of Pleshy Castle in Essex, was an Anglo-Norman nobleman who became Hereditary Constable of England from 1199.

Origins
He was the son and heir of Humphrey III de Bohun (pre-1144-1181) 
of Trowbridge Castle in Wiltshire and of Caldicot Castle in south-east Wales, 5th feudal baron of Trowbridge, who served King Henry II as Lord High Constable of England. His mother was Margaret of Huntingdon, widow of Conan IV, Duke of Brittany (d.1171) and a daughter of Henry of Scotland, 3rd Earl of Northumberland, 3rd Earl of Huntingdon, son of King David I of Scotland by his wife Maud, 2nd Countess of Huntingdon. Henry's half-sister was Constance, Duchess of Brittany.

Earldom 
His paternal grandmother was Margaret of Hereford, a daughter of Miles FitzWalter of Gloucester, 1st Earl of Hereford, Lord of Brecknock (died 1143), Sheriff of Gloucester and Constable of England. After the male line of Miles of Gloucester failed, in 1199 King John created Henry de Bohun Earl of Hereford and Constable of England. His lands lay chiefly on the Welsh Marches, and from this date the Bohuns took a foremost place among the Marcher barons.

Henry de Bohun was one of the twenty-five barons elected by their peers to enforce the terms of Magna Carta in 1215. He was subsequently excommunicated by the Pope. In the civil war that followed Magna Carta, he was a supporter of King Louis VIII of France and was captured at the Battle of Lincoln in 1217.

Marriage and issue
He married Maud de Mandeville (alias Maud FitzGeoffrey), daughter and heiress of Geoffrey Fitz Peter, 1st Earl of Essex, of Pleshy Castle in Essex, by whom he had issue including:
Humphrey IV de Bohun, 2nd Earl of Hereford, 1st Earl of Essex (1204-1275), eldest son and heir, created Earl of Essex in 1239, who married Maud de Lusignan, by whom he had at least three children.
Henry de Bohun, who died young.
Ralph de Bohun.

Death
He died in June 1220 while on crusade to the Holy Land.

References

Sources

Cokayne, G. (ed. by V. Gibbs). Complete Peerage of England, Scotland, Ireland, Great Britain and the United Kingdom. London:1887-1896, H-457-459

1176 births
1220 deaths
01
Anglo-Normans
Lord High Constables of England
Magna Carta barons
Bohun family
Christians of the Fifth Crusade